During the 1966–67 English football season, Brentford competed in the Football League Fourth Division. In a season overshadowed by the events of 19 January 1967, a promotion charge was derailed by five defeats in the final six matches of the campaign.

Season summary 
In a bid to buy Brentford out of the bottom two divisions of the Football League, the large transfer funds made available by chairman Jack Dunnett to previous managers Malky MacDonald and Tommy Cavanagh had left the club with mounting debts. Cavanagh had spent £30,000 on seven players since being appointed to the manager's job in January 1965, with five key attacking players (Bloomfield, Lazarus, Ward, Bonson and Fielding) being sold on for a total less than half that sum during the course of the 1965–66 Third Division season, towards the end of which he was sacked. New manager Billy Gray failed to halt Brentford's relegation slide, which meant that the club would be members of the Fourth Division for the 1966–67 season. An average home attendance of 11,000 would be needed to break even, a record which had been falling year on year since the 1963–64 season. A net loss on the previous season of £19,823 on the previous season (equivalent to £ in ) meant that manager Gray had no money to buy established players and so brought in a number of youngsters, including his nephew John Richardson.

The Bees had a good start to the season, winning the first two matches to sit top of the Fourth Division, but despite the strikeforce being bolstered by experienced Brian Bedford, a winless run of five defeats in eight matches dropped the club into the relegation places in mid-October 1966. Manager Billy Gray then made wholesale changes to the starting XI, introducing a number of youngsters, with the new-look team going on to win five consecutive matches. The establishment of the new lineup led to a clearout of players, with out-of-favour Micky Block, Billy Cobb, John Regan, Mel Scott and Ron Crisp all exiting Griffin Park before the end of the season. The Bees failed to keep up their good form through November and December and dropped back into mid-table. The team weathered the storm caused by the tumultuous events of 19 January 1967, which resulted in the departure of chairman Jack Dunnett and manager Billy Gray. Trainer Jimmy Sirrel took over as acting manager and built on the improved January form under Gray and led the team on a 16-match unbeaten league run, which equalled the club record at the time. The run left Brentford within three points of the promotion places, but an inexplicable five consecutive defeats in the final six matches of the season ended any chances of promotion.

The Brentford reserve team had a successful season, beating local rivals Fulham in a replay to win the 1966–67 London Challenge Cup.

League table

Results
Brentford's goal tally listed first.

Legend

Football League Fourth Division

FA Cup

Football League Cup 

 Sources: 100 Years Of Brentford, Statto

Playing squad 
Players' ages are as of the opening day of the 1966–67 season.

 Sources: 100 Years Of Brentford, Timeless Bees

Coaching staff

Billy Gray (20 August 1965 – March 1967)

Jimmy Sirrel (March – 13 May 1967)

Statistics

Appearances and goals
Substitute appearances in brackets.

Players listed in italics left the club mid-season.
Source: 100 Years Of Brentford

Goalscorers 

Players listed in italics left the club mid-season.
Source: 100 Years Of Brentford

Management

Summary

Transfers & loans

Awards 
 Supporters' Player of the Year: John Docherty

References 

Brentford F.C. seasons
Brentford